DS7, DS-7, or DS 7 may refer to:

 DS 7 Crossback, a French compact SUV
 Maybach Zeppelin DS7, a German full-size sedan
 Yamaha DS7, a Japanese motorcycle